Muenster ( or ) or munster is a semi-soft cheese from the United States. It is thought to be an imitation of the Alsatian washed-rind Munster cheese, introduced by German immigrants. It is distinct from the processed dairy food Sweet Muenster Cheese. Its name is not related to the German cities of Münster in Westphalia or in Lower Saxony or the Irish province of Munster, but rather to the city of Munster in Alsace, which was part of Germany at the time the cheese was introduced in the US by German immigrants, but is now in France. 

Muenster is pale in color and smooth in texture with an orange rind. The cheese is made from pasteurized cow's milk. The rind's orange color is from annatto, a sweet and nutty seasoning used to add flavor and color to cheeses such as Cheddar, Colby, Red Leicester, and Mimolette. Muenster usually has a very mild flavor and smooth, soft texture. In some cases, when properly aged, it can develop a strong flavor with a pungent aroma. This cheese is commonly served as an appetizer. Because it melts well, it is also often used in dishes such as grilled cheese sandwiches, tuna melts, quesadillas, cheeseburgers, macaroni and cheese, and pizza.

The spelling "Muenster" distinguishes the American cheese from Munster cheese, which is made from unpasteurized cow's milk in the Vosges mountains in Alsace. The orange tinge of Munster's rind occurs naturally as a byproduct of the cheese-making process. A regional variation is also produced in the Franche-Comté region in France. The name Munster-Géromé, used today in France, is a protected A.O.C. and is strictly regulated in its production technique and source geography.

See also

 List of cheeses

References

American cheeses